Hippotion pentagramma is a moth of the family Sphingidae. It is known from the arid areas in Arabia, Somalia and Ethiopia.

References

 Pinhey, E. (1962): Hawk Moths of Central and Southern Africa. Longmans Southern Africa, Cape Town.

Hippotion
Moths described in 1910
Insects of Ethiopia
Fauna of Somalia
Moths of Africa